The Errinundra National Park is a national park located in the Gippsland region of Victoria, Australia.

Features

The Errinundra National Park preserves the largest remaining cool temperate rainforest in Victoria and supports some of south eastern Australia's most spectacular old growth forests. There are also many rare and threatened species of flora and fauna, including powerful owls, tiger quolls and long-footed potoroos.

Cool and warm temperate rainforest, wet open forest, montane forests and woodlands are the dominant vegetation communities. There is also a sub-alpine wetland.

The majority of the park is accessible only in the drier months. In winter, rain and snow generally make the unsealed roads impassable.

There has been extensive logging of all forest types surrounding the park including Brown Mountain forest and there have been some instances of logging within the national park's boundaries due to administrative errors. In addition, logging occurred in many areas before the national park was established.

See also

 Tarra-Bulga National Park
 Protected areas of Victoria

References

External links

 
 Goongerah Environment Centre

National parks of Victoria (Australia)
East Gippsland
Protected areas established in 1988
Forests of Victoria (Australia)
1988 establishments in Australia